Cadomin  is a hamlet in the west-central Alberta, Canada within Yellowhead County. It is served by a spur of the Canadian National Railway.

Statistics Canada recognizes Cadomin as a designated place. It is located in Census Division No. 14 and in the riding of Yellowhead. It is administered by Yellowhead County.

History 
Cadomin's name is an acronym for 'Canadian Dominion Mining', and the community gives its name to the Cadomin Formation, which forms a nearby prominent outcrop.

Cadomin is one of many communities in the Alberta Coal Branch area that thrived from the 1920s to the 1950s. During the early 1930s, Cadomin's population peaked at 1,800. Other Coal Branch communities included Mountain Park, Luscar, Mercoal, and farther to the east, Robb, Embarras, Coalspur, Coal Valley, Lovett, and Foothills.

Mining
The Cadomin Coal Company began operations in 1917 and four underground mines were eventually developed, as well as a surface mine that operated from 1944 to 1950. The main coal seam, called the No. 1 Seam, averaged  in thicknesses. The strata in the area are strongly folded and faulted, and the seam is strongly inclined to overturned, so a variety of methods were employed to work it. The coal was sold primarily as steam coal for railroad use, and the Cadomin coal mines closed in 1952 due to declining markets as the railroads replaced steam locomotives with diesel.

Cadomin Quarry, operated by the Lehigh Cement Company (formerly Inland Cement), continues to employ a small number of local residents.

Demographics 

Attractions 

Cadomin Cave, located several kilometres to the south, used to attract a number of tourists during the summer months, although it remains undeveloped. The caves have been closed since 2010 due to the fungus growth the bats developed.

In the area around Cadomin, there are extensive trails for horse back riding, all-terrain vehicles and dirt biking. Mountain biking is becoming increasingly popular as well. Bird watching is a popular hobby, and there are also regular butterfly counts every year.

The scientific and naturalist communities spend a great deal of time studying the extensive wildlife including bighorn sheep, grizzly bears, moose, elk, and other mountain species.

The fall provides numerous big game hunting opportunities for deer, moose and bighorn sheep.

See also 
List of communities in Alberta
List of designated places in Alberta
List of hamlets in Alberta

References 

Designated places in Alberta
Hamlets in Alberta
Yellowhead County